Agios Konstantinos may refer to several places in Cyprus and Greece:

Agios Konstantinos, East Attica
Agios Konstantinos, Laconia, a village near Sparti, Greece
Agios Konstantinos, Phthiotis
Agios Konstantinos Marmaris, a settlement in Euboea, Greece
Agios Konstantinos, Cyprus
Agios Konstantinos, a town in Oropedio Lasithiou (Lasithi)